North Frisian may refer to:

 Something of, from, or related to North Frisia
 North Frisian language
 North Frisians
 North Frisian Islands
 North Frisian Barrier Island

See also 
 Frisian (disambiguation)

Language and nationality disambiguation pages